Yacht Rock is an online video series following the  fictionalized lives and careers of American soft rock stars of the late 1970s and early 1980s. The series debuted on Channel 101 at the June 26, 2005 screening. It placed in the top five at subsequent screenings until the June 25, 2006 screening, where it placed seventh and was canceled. The show remained a popular download on Channel 101, convincing the creators to make two additional episodes independently. The 11th episode, featuring Jason Lee as Kevin Bacon, debuted during a screening at the Knitting Factory in New York City on December 27, 2007, and was later included with the other episodes on Channel 101. On May 5, 2010, the 12th and final episode of Yacht Rock was released onto YouTube and Channel 101. The series inspired the term "yacht rock" as a musical descriptor for the songs and artists it features.

Creation and inspiration 
The series was written, directed, and produced by J. D. Ryznar, co-produced by David Lyons and Hunter D. Stair, and edited by Lane Farnham. The production has a "bad-on-purpose aesthetic".

Ryznar and Stair devised the series after noticing the converging recording careers of such bands as Steely Dan, Toto, and The Doobie Brothers, and the singer-songwriters Kenny Loggins and Michael McDonald. For example, McDonald co-wrote Loggins' "This Is It" and Loggins co-wrote McDonald's hit, "What a Fool Believes," for his band The Doobie Brothers. McDonald also performed backing vocals for several other 'yacht rock' artists, including Steely Dan, Toto and Christopher Cross.

Ryznar admits to having a fascination with the music of the period. As he explained, "Getting into Steely Dan really started this for me, as did the ability to buy dollar records at Amoeba and put them on tapes for my car. Kenny Loggins has made his way into all the pilots I've been involved with except [one]."
As Ryznar told Reuters contributor Andy Sullivan, "I'm making fun of the songwriting process, but the music is generally treated pretty lovingly."

Synopsis 
Yacht Rock'''s episodes are "hosted" by "Hollywood" Steve Huey, a music critic for AllMusic. The term "Yacht Rock" is never used throughout the series by any characters, except for Huey during his introductions; instead, it is always referred to as "smooth music".

The series depicts some realistic aspects of the music, but builds exaggerated storylines around them. For example, main protagonists Loggins and McDonald, played by Stair and Ryznar, receive inspiration from a fictional impresario named Koko Goldstein, played by Lyons, whose death in Episode 2 ultimately leads them to go their separate ways musically. Another example is the series' depiction of several real-life characters.  McDonald is an idealistic and earnest singer/songwriter, but takes both smooth music and himself far too seriously. Loggins is his easygoing friend and frequent collaborator who eventually abandons smooth music in favor of commercial rock and roll in the 80s, which strains their friendship. The portrayal of John Oates as the abusive, foulmouthed leader of Hall & Oates, exerting sometimes violent control over the milquetoast Daryl Hall, is clearly different from reality, in which Hall is the main lead vocalist and songwriter with no hint of a rivalry. Christopher Cross, played by Justin Roiland, is depicted as a wide-eyed, timid hayseed whose song "Sailing" is lauded as the "smoothest song ever." Loggins' former partner Jim Messina, played by Farnham, is a bitter wino who hates Loggins for his success and perceived betrayal. Michael Jackson is depicted as a hard-rock enthusiast who believes his partnership with guitarist Eddie Van Halen will lead to an endless parade of female sexual conquests. Jeff "Skunk" Baxter, the Doobie Brothers' lead guitarist, is seen threatening to kick McDonald "out of the Doobies" if he doesn't write them another hit. (The real Baxter did bring fellow Steely Dan alumnus McDonald into the band but, as they achieved their greatest commercial success, Baxter left the Doobie Brothers because of his displeasure with their new commercial sound and attitude.) The Eagles (portrayed here as jock-like meatheads) and Steely Dan (portrayed as snarky nerds, with Donald Fagen speaking in an incoherent babble of scat that only the truly smooth can understand) really did insert lyrical references to each other in their music as depicted in the show, but these were actually friendly in nature, not part of a longtime grudge involving baseball bats and lunch-money shakedowns.

Reception
John Oates credited Yacht Rock in 2007 with rekindling interest in Hall & Oates and lowering the demographic age of the group's fans saying:

Michael McDonald commented on Yacht Rock in a 2008 interview:

In 2015, SiriusXM first broadcast a limited-time "Yacht Rock Radio" channel on satellite from August 21 – September 22. This SXM satellite channel has "popped up" every summer since, most recently from late May to early October 2021, while also maintaining a year-round dedicated Yacht Rock online streaming channel for the ever-increasing fan base.

 Beyond Yacht Rock 
In 2016, Ryznar, Huey, Stair, and Lyons began a podcast called Beyond Yacht Rock. This series revolves around top-ten countdowns of genres they have newly invented, as well as episodes built around analyses of the work of musicians such as Steve Perry and Van Halen. The series also includes more commentary on the yacht rock style, such as evaluating songs according to whether or not they fit the Yacht Rock creators' description of the style (which they call "Yacht or Nyacht").

 Episode list 
 "What a Fool Believes"
 In the pilot episode, Kenny Loggins, under the guidance of Koko Goldstein, reaches out to a struggling Michael McDonald, who's having trouble writing a smooth hit for his band the Doobie Brothers.
 Featured songs - "Sailin' the Wind" by Loggins and Messina; "Whenever I Call You Friend" by Kenny Loggins; "What a Fool Believes" by the Doobie Brothers; also featured as incidental music (played at the outset of the episode) is "Breezin'" by George Benson.
 "Keep the Fire"
 Loggins and McDonald pair up against the duo Hall & Oates for a songwriting competition. Koko is accidentally impaled by his lucky harpoon during the ensuing melee, but is at peace before his death by hearing the smoothest song ever sung, "Sailing", by a young Christopher Cross.
 Featured songs - "Sara Smile" and "Portable Radio" by Hall and Oates; "This is It" by Kenny Loggins; "Sailing" by Christopher Cross. The intro of "Peg" by Steely Dan is played at the outset of the episode.
 "I'm Alright"
 As everyone grieves Koko's death, Loggins lashes out at McDonald and "smooth music" as a whole, causing a rift between the two. Sleazy entertainment executive Gene Balboa, who is producing the movie Caddyshack, demands that the movie's director, Harold Ramis, obtain Loggins' talents to write the movie's theme song.  Ramis takes advantage of an angry and confused Loggins and gets him to write and record the hard rock song "I'm Alright", much to McDonald's dismay.
 Featured songs: "Time Out of Mind" by Steely Dan; "Keep the Fire" by Kenny Loggins; "How do the Fools Survive" by The Doobie Brothers; "Lights" and "Any Way You Want It" by Journey; "Kid Charlemagne" by Steely Dan; "I'm Alright" by Kenny Loggins.
 "Rosanna"
 Steve Porcaro (Steve Agee), the keyboard player of the band Toto, is asked by his girlfriend, Rosanna Arquette (Morgan Murphy), to write a song about her, and she wants Michael McDonald to sing on the track.  Discouraged by McDonald's disdain for his band, Porcaro devises a three-step plan to make it happen.
 Featured songs: "Hold The Line" and "Rosanna" by Toto; Ride Like the Wind by Christopher Cross; "Don't Fight It" by Kenny Loggins and Steve Perry
 "Believe in It"
 Toto has been commissioned to write a smooth song for Michael Jackson's Thriller, but Jackson rejects the band, believing after working with Eddie Van Halen on "Beat It" that such material is in his past. Fearing that Jackson will destroy "smooth music" for a decade, Porcaro turns to McDonald, Loggins, Skunk Baxter, Cross, and Vincent Price (James Adomian), to summon up Koko's ghost for help writing "Human Nature."
 Featured songs - "Believe In It" by Michael McDonald; "Beat It" by Michael Jackson; "Thriller" by Michael Jackson; "I Gotta Try" by Kenny Loggins and Michael McDonald (both versions); "Eruption" by Van Halen; "Human Nature" by Steve Porcaro and John Bettis, performed by Michael Jackson.
 "The Seed Drill"
 "Hollywood" Steve's father demands that Steve stop wasting his time on Yacht Rock, and relates a historic tale of the agriculturist Jethro Tull, the plot of which is similar to episode one. Featured songs: "Aqualung", "Teacher", "Jack in the Green", "Living in the Past" and "The Whistler" by Jethro Tull
 "I Keep Forgettin'"
 McDonald and Loggins make a bet about the popularity of McDonald's new song, "I Keep Forgettin' (Every Time You're Near)". Ten years later, Long Beach-based rappers Warren G and Nate Dogg struggle with finding a sound within the gangsta rap world. After the two accidentally hit McDonald with their car and then take him back to their house, a solution is found to everyone's problems.
 Featured songs - "I Keep Forgettin' (Every Time You're Near)" by Michael McDonald; "Swear Your Love" by Kenny Loggins; "Gz and Hustlas" by Snoop Dogg; "Let Me Ride" by Dr. Dre; "Who Am I? (What's My Name?)" by Snoop Dogg; "Regulate" by Warren G ft Nate Dogg;
 "Gino (the Manager)"
 "Hollywood" Steve returns to the very beginning, where Doobie Brothers producer Ted Templeman (Dan Harmon) explains his dream about the origin of "the smoothest rock [he's] ever heard" to Skunk Baxter over lunch.  Baxter suggests seeing Koko about it, and Templeman starts seeing his dream become real as he meets a young McDonald, then a background singer for Steely Dan, being talked into joining the Doobie Brothers by Steely Dan and Koko, Loggins showing signs of his imminent break from Messina and solo stardom, and an effeminate Hall and Oates with a very familiar looking manager named Gino, who tries to bully McDonald and Loggins into employing him as a manager.  When they refuse, he plots revenge.
 Featured songs - "Love Will Keep Us Together" by Captain and Tennille, "Any World (That I'm Welcome To)" by Steely Dan, "Watching The River Run" by Loggins And Messina, "Gino (The Manager)" by  Daryl Hall & John Oates, "Takin' It To The Streets" by The Doobie Brothers.
 "Runnin' with the Devil"
 Van Halen puts a curse on Ted Templeman to force him to produce their hard rock song. In a subplot, Loggins loses his car keys and has everyone in the studio helping him look. Comedian Drew Carey makes a cameo appearance along with fellow Whose Line Is It Anyway'' star Jeff Davis, who plays David Lee Roth in this episode.
 Featured songs - "Atomic Punk" by Van Halen, "Runnin' with the Devil" by Van Halen, "Echoes of Love" by The Doobie Brothers, "I'm the One" by Van Halen. In addition, a short clip of the Ian Hunter song "Cleveland Rocks" (as recorded by The Presidents of the United States of America for The Drew Carey Show) is also used during the introduction with Carey.
 "FM"
 Steely Dan and the Eagles settle a long-time, childish feud with a hit song.
 Featured songs - "I Believe in Love" by Kenny Loggins, "Life in the Fast Lane" by The Eagles, "Everything You Did" by Steely Dan, "Do It Again" by Steely Dan, "Peg" by Steely Dan, "Hotel California" by the Eagles, "FM (No Static At All)" by Steely Dan. In addition, an instrument snippet of "Winter" by Tori Amos is used in the introduction.
 "Footloose"
 Jimmy Buffett is convinced by Kevin Bacon (Jason Lee) and Gene Balboa to trick Loggins into making yet another movie song. He is subsequently kidnapped by Buffett and psychotic "Parrot Heads", and it's up to McDonald and James Ingram (Wyatt Cenac) to rescue him.
 Featured Songs - "Holding Out for a Hero" by Bonnie Tyler; "If It's Not What You're Looking For" by Kenny Loggins; "Yah Mo B There" by James Ingram & Michael McDonald; "Changes in Latitudes, Changes in Attitudes" by Jimmy Buffett; "I'm Free (Heaven Helps the Man)" by Kenny Loggins; " Margaritaville", "Pencil Thin Mustache", "Why Don't We Get Drunk", and "Boat Drinks" by Jimmy Buffett; "Footloose" by Kenny Loggins.
 "Danger Zone"
 As the mid '80s approach, McDonald feels that with the death of Yacht Rock, he has become the irrelevant joke he always feared he would become. Loggins, on the other hand, has grown to love doing movie soundtracks and his career is still in high gear. Extraterrestrial/composer Giorgio Moroder (John Konesky) is sent to Earth to seek Loggins' assistance in fighting a black hole that will destroy Moroder's planet. Fearing for his friend's life, McDonald tries to rescue him, and in the process, finds his relevance. By the end of the episode the loose ends of the past 11 episodes are tied together (including the revelation that all of Yacht Rock had been a plan by Koko - to lead to the song "Sweet Freedom"), but left with a cliffhanger ending as to who murdered Koko. Rob Schrab, Matt Braunger, and Dahéli Hall make cameo appearances as Bruce Springsteen, Huey Lewis, and Tina Turner, respectively.
 Featured Songs - "We Are the World" by USA for Africa, "Charm the Snake" by Christopher Cross, "Method of Modern Love" by Hall and Oates, "Danger Zone" by Kenny Loggins, "Playing with the Boys" by Kenny Loggins, "Sweet Freedom" by Michael McDonald, "Sailing" by Christopher Cross.

Real people portrayed in Yacht Rock 

Sara Allen
Ian Anderson
Michael Anthony (referred to as 'the other guy')
Rosanna Arquette
Dan Aykroyd
Kevin Bacon
Jeff "Skunk" Baxter
Walter Becker
Jeremiah Birnbaum
David Bowie
Lindsey Buckingham
Jimmy Buffett
Kim Carnes
Peter Cetera
Ray Charles
Chevy Chase
Christopher Cross
Nate Dogg
Daryl Dragon
Dr. Dre
Bob Dylan
Donald Fagen
Glenn Frey
Warren G
Daryl Hall
Don Henley
David Hungate
James Ingram
La Toya Jackson
Michael Jackson
Al Jarreau
Cyndi Lauper
Huey Lewis
Kenny Loggins
Steve Lukather
Michael McDonald
Jim Messina
Giorgio Moroder
Willie Nelson
John Oates
David Paich
Steve Perry
Jeff Porcaro
Steve Porcaro
Vincent Price
Harold Ramis
Kenny Rogers
David Lee Roth
Tom Savarese
Patrick Simmons
Paul Simon
Bruce Springsteen
Ted Templeman
Toni Tennille
Charles, Lord Townshend
Jethro Tull
Tina Turner
Alex Van Halen
Eddie Van Halen
Dionne Warwick

See also
List of soft rock artists and songs
Soft pop
Culture of California

References

External links 

 Official Website
 J. D. Ryznar's YouTube channel, which includes all 12 episodes
 "Sail Away: The Oral History of 'Yacht Rock'" 
 

Channel 101
Internet memes
American comedy web series
American mockumentary television series
Television series set in the 1970s
Television series set in the 1980s
Television shows set in Los Angeles County, California